Tomnacross is a small hamlet and part of the village of Kiltarlity, about 20 km west of the city of Inverness in the Highland Council area of Scotland. It is the location of the Kiltarlity village school (Tomnacross Primary), Kiltarlity Church, and a cemetery. There are also several houses in the area. The Tartan Heart Festival takes place nearby on the Belladrum Estate.

The name "Tomnacross" is a 19th-century anglicisation of "tom na croiche", Scottish Gaelic for "knowe of the gallows". This refers to the gallows which were on a stepped hill in the churchyard.

For most of its history, Tomnacross has been little more than a few crofts above the village of Kiltarlity. In 1766 however, the area's ecclesiastical establishment (i.e. manse, glebe, and church) moved from just south of the River Beauly to what is the present-day kirk.

Tomnacross Primary School was built in 1875, though has been extended several times over the years. Originally also a secondary school, it became solely a primary school in about 1970. The current school roll is 90, plus 28 in the nursery. Secondary school pupils travel to Charleston Academy in Inverness.

Kiltarlity Church is part of the Church of Scotland. The modern church was built in 1829, on the site of a previous incarnation built the century before, and is a Category B listed building.

References

Populated places in Inverness committee area

nl:Aberarder